Bereşti may refer to several places in Romania:

Berești, a town in Galați County
Bereşti, a village in Sascut Commune, Bacău County
Bereşti, a village in Hănțești Commune, Suceava County
Bereşti, a village in Lăpușata Commune, Vâlcea County
Berești-Bistrița, a commune in Bacău County
Berești-Meria, a commune in Galaţi County
Berești-Tazlău, a commune in Bacău County